Euroscaptor is a genus of mammal in the family Talpidae. Members are found in China and South & Southeast Asia. It contains the following species as of October 2021:

 Greater Chinese mole (Euroscaptor grandis)
 Kloss's mole (Euroscaptor klossi)
Kuznetsov's mole (Euroscaptor kuznetsovi)
 Long-nosed mole (Euroscaptor longirostris)
 Malaysian mole (Euroscaptor malayanus) 
 Himalayan mole (Euroscaptor micrurus)
Ngoc Linh mole (Euroscaptor ngoclinhensis)
Orlov's mole (Euroscaptor orlovi)
 Small-toothed mole (Euroscaptor parvidens)
 Vietnamese mole (Euroscaptor subanura)

References

Euroscaptor
Mammal genera
Taxonomy articles created by Polbot